The Men's 1000 metres competition at the 2021 World Single Distances Speed Skating Championships was held on 13 February 2021.

Results
The race was started at 16:02.

References

Men's 1000 metres